Enterovibrio nigricans is a bacterium species from the genus of Enterovibrio which has been isolated from the head kidney of the fish Sparus aurata from the Mediterranean coast in Spain.

References 

Vibrionales
Bacteria described in 2009